In 2006, up to 3 building collapses were reported in Lagos, Nigeria.

March

On March 22, the top nine stories of a 21-story Nigerian Industrial Development Bank building in Lagos, Nigeria collapsed. This happened after a fire had gutted two stories in the building earlier that month. Heavy winds during a thunderstorm caused the building to cave in from the structural weakness after the fire. This building was located in the commercial centre of the city. The building then sat vacant and in ruins for the next 2 years until it was ultimately imploded on September 21, 2008, making it the first building to be imploded in Nigeria. A parking lot now occupies the site.

Casualties
One person was killed while 24 were reported injured.

July
The July collapse was a disaster that occurred on July 18, 2006 when a four-story block of flats collapsed in Lagos, Nigeria. At least 25 people were killed. It is thought the accident was caused by poor construction. The building was under three years old. The building was a residential building composed of 36 flats. Officials said that those responsible for the building's collapse would be prosecuted.

Rescue operations and casualties
Rescue operations were carried out by the Red Cross and local volunteers. Rain hampered efforts on the first night of searching. Altogether 50 people were found alive.

November
In November an unfinished, three-story building still under construction collapsed. Two construction workers were killed.

Rescue operations and casualties
The Red Cross led rescue efforts to find people. Twelve people were saved with only minor injuries. The first day of rescue efforts were slowed by the fact that no heavy equipment had been assigned for cleaning refuse and looking for bodies.

References

The March collapse(scroll to halfway down page)
Nigeria’s collapsed buildings cost lives as well as money
The July collapse
The November collapse

External links
The March collapse (photos)
The July collapse rescue efforts (photos)

Building collapses in 2006
Lagos building collapse
21st century in Lagos
Building collapses in Nigeria
March 2006 events in Nigeria
July 2006 events in Nigeria
November 2006 events in Africa
2006 disasters in Nigeria